Dostyk (Dostyq) or Druzhba is a small town in Kazakhstan's Almaty Region, on the border with Xinjiang, China.  It is a port of entry (by highway and railroad) from China.  The rail portion serves as an important link in the Eurasian Land Bridge.  It is situated in the Dzungarian Gate, a historically significant mountain pass.

Railways 
The agreement between the Soviet Union and the PRC to connect Kazakhstan with Western China by rail was achieved in 1954.  On the Soviet side, the railway reached the border town of Druzhba (Dostyk) (whose names, both Russian and Kazakh, mean 'friendship' in each respective language) in 1959.  On the Chinese side, however, the westward construction of the Lanzhou-Xinjiang railway was stopped once it reached Urumqi in 1962.  Due to the Sino-Soviet Split, the border town remained a sleepy backwater for some 30 years, until the railway link was finally completed on September 12, 1990.

The port of entry on the Chinese side is Alashankou.

There is a bogie exchange depot to facilitate the through movement of freight and passengers railcars.

Uniform gauge 
It is proposed to build a standard gauge Transcontinental Railway to link Europe and China to bypass these two breaks of gauge. This project was signed in 2004.

The other end of this proposed uniform gauge line is at Gorgan in Iran.

See also 
 Qazaqstan Temir Zholy (Kazakhstan Railways)
 Kyakhta

References

External links 
 Tageo.com

Populated places in Almaty Region
China–Kazakhstan border crossings